Mumbai controls several dams in Shahpur taluk (Thane district) that deliver water to the city. The Western Ghats trap most of the moisture laden monsoon clouds which feed these dammed rivers. Currently, these dams deliver approximately 3.4 billion litres of water to Mumbai daily. Here are the dams supplying the city the water it needs to survive:

Tansa and Vaitarna dams supply the southern region of Mumbai, while the rest supply the suburbs. An underground tank in Malabar Hills is used to store the water.

References

Geography of Mumbai
Water supply and sanitation in India